Marian College may refer to:

In Australia
Marian College (Ararat), Victoria, Australia
Marian College (Sunshine West), Victoria, Australia
Marian Catholic College (Kenthurst), New South Wales, Australia

In Ireland
Marian College (Dublin), Dublin, Ireland

In India
Marian College Kuttikkanam, India

In New Zealand
Marian College (Christchurch), New Zealand

In the United States
Marian University (Indiana), United States
Marian University (Wisconsin), United States
Marist College, New York, United States, named Marian College from 1946 to 1960

See also
Marian (disambiguation)
Marian University (disambiguation)